This is a list of Russian Orthodox churches that are individually notable.  This includes churches of the semi-autonomous Russian Orthodox Church Outside Russia and churches in Russia and elsewhere not within ROCOR's system.

Argentina 
Cathedral of the Most Holy Trinity, Buenos Aires

Armenia 
Church of the Intercession of the Holy Mother of God, Yerevan

Azerbaijan 
Church of Michael the Archangel, Baku, Baku
Holy Myrrhbearers Cathedral, Baku

Canada 
List of Russian Orthodox Churches in Toronto Area

Cuba 

Our Lady of Kazan Orthodox Cathedral, Havana

Denmark 

Alexander Nevsky Church, Copenhagen

France 
Russian Orthodox Cathedral, Nice
Alexander Nevsky Cathedral, Paris

Germany 

Russian Orthodox Church, Dresden
Russian Orthodox Chapel, Weimar
St Elizabeth's Church, Wiesbaden

Israel 

Church of Mary Magdalene, East Jerusalem

Latvia 

Ss. Boris and Gleb Cathedral, Daugavpils

Lithuania 

Orthodox Church of St. Michael and St. Constantine, Vilnius

Luxembourg 

St. Peter and Paul Church, Luxembourg

Morocco 

Russian Orthodox Church in Rabat, Rabat

Norway 

Bakke Church, Trondheim

Russia

Moscow and region 

Alexander Nevsky Cathedral, Moscow
Saint Basil's Cathedral, Red Square, Moscow
Cathedral of Christ the Saviour, Moscow, tallest Orthodox Christian church in the world
Dormition Cathedral, Moscow
Saint Sophia Church, Moscow, Balchug Island, Moscow
All-Merciful Savior Church (Gagino), near Moscow
Holy Field, near Moscow
Orekhovo-Borisovo Metochion, in Orekhovo-Borisovo, near Moscow
Church of Righteous John the Russian, in Kuntsevo, Moscow

Saint Petersburg 

Annunciation Church of the Alexander Nevsky Lavra
Dukhovskaya Church
Feodorovskaya Church
Gate Church
Holy Trinity Cathedral of the Alexander Nevsky Lavra
Kazan Cathedral, St. Petersburg
Saint Andrew's Cathedral (Saint Petersburg)
St. Vladimir's Cathedral (St. Petersburg)
Transfiguration Cathedral (Saint Petersburg)
Trinity Cathedral, Saint Petersburg
Chesme Church, St. Petersburg
Church of Our Lady the Merciful, St. Petersburg
Church of the Savior on Blood, St. Petersburg
Saint Isaac's Cathedral, St. Petersburg
Peter and Paul Cathedral, St. Petersburg
Saint Sampson's Cathedral, St. Petersburg
St. Nicholas Naval Cathedral, St. Petersburg
Smolny Convent, near St. Petersburg
Sophia Cathedral, Sophia, near St. Petersburg

Novgorod and area 

Saint Nicholas Cathedral, Novgorod
Saint Sophia Cathedral in Novgorod
Sts. Peter and Paul Church, Novgorod
Church of St. Paraskevi, Novgorod
Saviour Church on Nereditsa

other 

Ascension Cathedral, Almaty
Alexander Nevsky Cathedral (Izhevsk)
St. Michael's Cathedral (Izhevsk)
Cathedral of Christ the Saviour (Kaliningrad)
Dormition Cathedral, Khabarovsk
Transfiguration Cathedral, Khabarovsk
Königsberg Cathedral
Naval Cathedral in Kronstadt
Saint Andrew's Cathedral, Kronstadt
Cathedral of St. Theodore Ushakov, Saransk, Mordovia
The Cathedral of the Holy and Righteous Warrior Feodor Ushakov, Saransk, Mordovia
Novocherkassk Cathedral, Novocherkassk
Alexander Nevsky Cathedral, Novosibirsk
Assumption Cathedral, Omsk
St. Nicholas Cossack Cathedral, Omsk
Ivanovsky Monastery, Pskov
Assumption Cathedral in Smolensk
Transfiguration Cathedral (Tolyatti)
Odigitrievsky Cathedral, Ulan Ude
Cathedral of Saint Demetrius, Vladimir
Dormition Cathedral, Vladimir
Saint Sophia Cathedral, Vologda
Annunciation Cathedral, Voronezh
Fyodorovskaya Church, Yaroslavl
Saint George Cathedral, Yuryev-Polsky

Serbia 
 Church of the Holy Trinity, Belgrade

United Arab Emirates 

Russian Orthodox Church, Sharjah

United Kingdom 

Russian Orthodox Cathedral of the Dormition of the Mother of God and All Saints, London
Cathedral of the Dormition of the Mother of God and the Holy Royal Martyrs, London

United States 

In the United States there are numerous notable Russian Orthodox churches, including many that were listed on the U.S. National Register of Historic Places in 1980 as part of one study.
In Alaska, the Russian America community includes more than 20,000 members of the Russian Orthodox church.  Many of the notable churches are current churches within List of Orthodox parishes in Alaska.

Churches include:

in Alaska 

(ordered by city or village)

other than in Alaska

See also 

Russian Bishop's House, Lincoln and Monastery Sts., Sitka, Alaska

Uruguay 

Russian Orthodox Church of the Resurrection, Montevideo

References 

Russian Orthodox
Russian Orthodox churches